The 46th Guillermo Mendoza Memorial Scholarship Foundation Box Office Entertainment Awards (GMMSF-BOEA), honored the personalities, movies and TV programs in the Philippines, and took place on June 14, 2015 at the Solaire Resort & Casino, Parañaque. The award-giving body honors Filipino actors, actresses and other performers' commercial success, regardless of artistic merit, in the Philippine entertainment industry.

Winners selection
The GMMSF selects the high-ranking Philippine films of 2014 based on total average rankings at box office published results (MMFF has not released the final gross tally for the 2014 edition.) as basis for awarding the three major categories in the awarding ceremonies, The Phenomenal Box Office Star, The Box Office King and The Box Office Queen.

The deliberations were held at the Barrio Fiesta Restaurant in Greenhills, San Juan on May 16, 2015 attended by the representatives of GMMSF. New Special Awards were introduced at this event. This includes the Corazon Mendoza Samaniego Lifetime Achievement Award, which was given to Vic Sotto. Also included in the new Special Awards were the Breakthrough Box Office Indie Film Award, as well as the All-Time Highest Grossing Horror Film Award.

Awards
Phenomenal Box Office Star
Vice Ganda (The Amazing Praybeyt Benjamin)
Box Office King
Piolo Pascual (Starting Over Again)
Box Office Queen
Toni Gonzaga (Starting Over Again)
Film Actor of the Year
John Lloyd Cruz
Film Actress of the Year
Iza Calzado
Prince of Philippine Movies & TV
Xian Lim
Princess of Philippine Movies & TV
Kim Chiu
Teen King of Philippine Movies & TV
Daniel Padilla
Teen Queen of Philippine Movies & TV
Kathryn Bernardo
Most Popular Love Team of Movies and TV
James Reid & Nadine Lustre
Most Promising Love Team on TV
Iñigo Pascual & Sofia Andres (Relax It’s Just Pag-ibig)
Most Promising Male Star
Andre Paras
Most Promising Female Star
Liza Soberano
Male Concert Performer of the Year
Gary Valenciano
Female Concert Performer of the Year
Regine Velasquez
Male Recording Artist of the Year
Gloc 9
Female Recording Artist of the Year
Sarah Geronimo
Promising Male Recording Artist of the Year
Darren Espanto
Promising Female Recording Artist of the Year
Maja Salvador
Most Popular Recording/Performing Group
Callalily
Most Promising Recording/Performing Group
Gimme 5
Most Popular Novelty Singer
Joey Ayala (Papel)
Breakthrough Recording/Performing Artist
Alden Richards (Wish I May)
Most Popular Male Child Performer
Bimby Aquino Yap
Most Popular Female Child Performer
Ryzza Mae Dizon
Most Popular Film Producer
Star Cinema
Most Popular Screenwriter
Carmi Raymundo & Olivia Lamasan (Starting All Over Again)
Most Popular Film Director
Wenn Deramas (The Amazing Praybeyt Benjamin)
Most Popular TV Program for News and Public Affairs
Kapuso Mo, Jessica Soho (GMA 7)
Most Popular Daytime Drama
Be Careful With My Heart (ABS-CBN 2)
Most Popular Primetime Drama
Ikaw Lamang (ABS-CBN 2)
Most Popular News and Public Affairs Program
Wish Ko Lang (GMA 7)
Most Popular TV Talent/Reality Program
The Voice Kids (ABS-CBN 2)
Most Popular TV Game Show
Celebrity Bluff (GMA 7)
Most Popular TV Program for Noontime/Variety
Eat Bulaga! (GMA 7)

Special awardsBert Marcelo Lifetime Achievement AwardAngelica PanganibanCorazon Samaniego Lifetime Achievement AwardVic SottoBreakthrough Box Office Indie FilmEnglish Only Please; Special recognition for Derek Ramsay and Jennylyn Mercado as lead actorsHighest Grossing Horror Film of All TimeFeng Shui 2 (P256 million)Global Achievement by a Performing GroupEl Gamma Penumbra (Asia’s Got Talent champion)Global Achievement in Sports'''
Michael Christian Martinez (figure skater, 2014 Winter Olympics)

References

Box Office Entertainment Awards
2015 film awards
2015 television awards
2015 music awards